Gee-Haw Stables (aka Mercedes' Gee-Haw Riding Academy) was a Harlem jazz club at 160 West 132nd Street, between 7th (Adam Clayton Powell, Jr., Boulevard) & Lenox Avenue (Malcolm X Boulevard). The club flourished from June 1940 to about 1945.

History 
Gee-Haw Stables, named because a sculpted horse's head graced the entrance, was a tiny after-hours club where the action started around 7  and would often go until noon. In 1941, the club was owned and operated by Johnny Bradford (born 1911), who, that same year, married Una Mae Carlisle At the time of their marriage, Bradford lived at 35 West 110th Street, and Carlisle lived at the Hotel Theresa.

In 1964 the Gee-Haw location was a Gulf Gas Station.

Other clubs managed by Bradford 
Bradford later managed other clubs in Harlem, including:
 Jimmy's Famous Chicken Shack, 763 St. Nicholas Avenue (between 148th and 149th Streets), Manhattan (Sugar Hill neighborhood), opened in 1937 as Jimmy Brown's Chicken Shack at 763 St. Nicholas Avenue; Bradford became the host of Jimmie's in 1949, when it was owned by Jimmy Bacon (né James Bacon; born 1915 Georgia); the lower level of 763 St. Nicholas Avenue, once called a parlor level, is currently a small Senegalese restaurant, "Tsion Cafe & Bakery"; 763 St. Nicholas, in the 1920s and 1930s was a funeral parlor – "Charles M. Jerolomon Parlors."
 The Barnyard (1953)

References 

1940 establishments in New York City
1945 disestablishments in New York (state)
Nightclubs in Manhattan
Former music venues in New York City
Defunct jazz clubs in New York City
Historically African-American theaters and music venues
Jazz clubs in Harlem
Harlem